The Philippines national ice hockey team is the national men's ice hockey team of the Philippines. They are controlled by the Federation of Ice Hockey League (FIHL) and a member of the International Ice Hockey Federation (IIHF) since 20 May 2016. The Philippines is currently ranked 54th in the IIHF World Ranking and will make its World Championship debut in Division IV tournament in 2023.

History

Early history
Prior to 2008, there were no organized leagues and an unofficial Philippine national team composed of players from selected clubs participated in regional tournaments. One such unofficial national team was "Manila Pilipinas" that participated at the HKAHC Invitational Amateur Ice Hockey Tournament in 2005. They were second runners-up team in the Bauhinia Division, the lowest of the three divisions in the invitational tournament.

Starting 2008, ice hockey in the Philippines began to gain traction. The Philippine national team participated again at the 2014 edition of the HKAHC invitational tournament. The team were champions of the Silver Plate Division, the second highest division in the tournament. It was in this tournament that the Philippines played against another national side. They won 10–0 over a Macau squad, sanctioned by the Macau Ice Sports Federation.

The Federation of Ice Hockey League (FIHL), a national ice hockey federation was then established in February 2015 to govern ice hockey in the Philippines making efforts to organize a formal national team easier.

2016: FIHL affiliation
The FIHL became an associate member of the IIHF on 20 May 2016 and by July 2016, the federation also became a member of the Philippine Olympic Committee (POC). The FIHL's membership with these two bodies made them eligible to send national teams including a men's national team to the official tournaments such as the IIHF Asia and Oceania Championship (formerly the IIHF Challenge Cup of Asia) and the Southeast Asian Games.

The Philippine national team participated once again at the HKAHC Invitational Amateur Ice Hockey Tournament for the 2016 edition. They settled for first runner-up place after they lost 4–3 in overtime to Mitsubishi Corp. in the Gold Plate Division final. They also played against the national team of Oman in the tournament.

Official FIHL tournament debut
The Philippine national team participated at the 2017 Asian Winter Games, which was their first official tournament. They participated in Division II of the tournament. The team, captained by Swiss-Filipino, Steven Füglister, underwent a seven-month training which started in July 2016 prior to the competition.

The team lost 10–5 in their first official match against Kyrgyzstan. Philippines secured their first official win as a FIHL member when they defeated Qatar with a score of 14–2 and was followed by an 8–3 triumph against Kuwait, who were competing as the Independent Olympic Athletes. The team finished third in their division following their 9–2 win over Macau in the play-off for third place.

2017 Southeast Asian Games

The Philippines participated at an ice hockey tournament event of the 2017 Southeast Asian Games. To prepare for the tournament, they participated at the 2017 Philippine Ice Hockey Tournament which was held at the SM Megamall Skating Rink in Mandaluyong. The national team finished third behind second placed New York-based Islanders Red and first placed Singaporean side Pandoo Nation.

The Philippine national team mentored by Czech head coach Daniel Brodan started their Southeast Asian Games campaign with a 12–0 victory over Indonesia. This was followed by their game against Singapore which ended with a 7–2 triumph.

This was then followed by their game against Malaysia which saw the ejection of the Philippine captain, Steven Füglister from the game in the first period. He was given a game misconduct penalty for hitting a Malaysian player in a head while pursuing the puck although the skipper said the infraction was an unintentional accident. The match ended with a 7–7 tie after regulation time after an extra five-minute-period which led to a shootout. The Philippines outscored Malaysia to register a win.

The Malaysian organizers decided to suspend Fuglister for the final match against Thailand. The Philippines appealed this decision but failed to overturn the suspension. Despite playing sans their captain, the Philippines wrapped up their campaign, undefeated with a 5–4 win over Thailand and clinched the first ever ice hockey gold medal in the history of the regional tournament.

2018 and 2019 IIHF Challenge Cup of Asia
The Philippines hosted the Top Division of the IIHF Challenge Cup of Asia from 3 to 8 April 2018, their first IIHF-sanctioned tournament, at the SM Mall of Asia Ice Skating Rink in Pasay, Metro Manila. The team was mentored by American head coach, Jonathan De Castro. The national team settled for bronze after tying in points with champions Mongolia and runners-up Thailand. Goal differences of the three teams with matches against the two other teams, Kuwait and Singapore, disregarded was used as tiebreaker to determine the final standing. The national team improved its best finish in the tournament in the following edition of the tournament in 2019 hosted in Malaysia. They lost to Mongolia in the final settling for second place.

2019 Southeast Asian Games
The Philippines failed to defend their Southeast Asian Games title at home in the 2019 edition of the regional games settling for a bronze medal finish.

Kaspersky, an internet security firm, sponsored their participation in the regional games.

IIHF World Championships
The Philippines' ice hockey governing body, the Federation of Ice Hockey League, from 2017, projects the national team's first participation in the IIHF World Championships within three to five years. They have applied to participate in the inaugural Division IV of the World Championships for the 2020 edition. However the tournament was cancelled due to the COVID-19 pandemic. The 2021 Division IV tournament would also get cancelled. The Philippines' debut  in the World Championship would be further postponed, after it withdrew from the 2022 Division IV tournament citing inability to train due to closure of ice rinks in the past two years due to the pandemic.

By August 2022, ice rinks have reopened and in October 2022, Finnish instructor Juhani Ijäs has been appointed as head coach and program director of the Philippine national team.

Tournament record

World Championships

Asian Winter Games

Challenge Cup of Asia

Southeast Asian Games

Team

Coaching history

Fixtures and results

All-time record against other national teams
Last match update: 8 December 2019

References

External links

IIHF profile
National Team of Ice Hockey profile

Ice hockey in the Philippines
National ice hockey teams in Asia
Ice hockey